David Bush (born January 11, 1951) is an American diver. He competed in the men's 3 metre springboard event at the 1972 Summer Olympics.

His sister, Lesley Bush, represented the U.S. in diving at the 1964 Summer Olympics.

References

1951 births
Living people
American male divers
Olympic divers of the United States
Divers at the 1972 Summer Olympics
People from Orange, New Jersey
Sportspeople from Essex County, New Jersey